Heinrich Robert Hellmuth Kudicke (born 12 December 1876 in Preußisch Eylau, East Prussia, died 8 May 1961) was a German physician, epidemiologist and one of the leading experts on tropical diseases in his lifetime. He worked in Tanganyika and China for several years. A long-time collaborator of Nobel laureate Robert Koch, he is especially known for his work with African trypanosomiasis or sleeping sickness in the early 20th century. During the early Cold War era he worked in several developing countries in connection with medical development aid programmes.

Career

He completed his medical studies at the Kaiser-Wilhelms-Akademie für das militärärztliche Bildungswesen and joined the medical service of the Royal Prussian Army as an officer in 1900. He worked as a military doctor in the colonial administration in German East Africa from 1902, and became director of the laboratory of the governmental hospital in Dar es Salaam from 1911. Kudicke was one of Nobel laureate Robert Koch's long-time collaborators and last surviving students, and participated in Koch's sleeping sickness expedition in German East Africa from 1906. He worked with sleeping sickness in the Lake Victoria area during the years 1907–1908 and 1910–1912, and later as director of the Institute for Sleeping Sickness in East Africa from 1913.

He served as a medical officer during the First World War. In 1921 he joined the Georg Speyer House, a medical foundation in Frankfurt, and he worked at the Institute for Tropical Medicine in Hamburg 1925–1927. He was then Professor of Bacteriology and dean of the medical faculty of the Sun Yat-sen University in Canton in the Republic of China from 1927 to 1933. He later worked in Frankfurt and after the occupation of Poland by the German Army as director of the State Institute of Hygiene
in Warsaw. The former director Ludwik Hirszfeld was dismissed as a "non-Aryan" from the Institute and forced to move into the Warsaw ghetto. Within his role in November and December 1941 Kudicke tested a new Typhus vaccine on 228 Jews of the Warsaw ghetto. 24 developed severe adverse effects and died later on.

After the war he was Professor of Epidemiology at the Goethe University Frankfurt from 1945, and then Professor Emeritus there until his death. He was also acting director of the Institute for Medical Microbiology and Infection Control from October 1945 to October 1946, when he was succeeded by Hans Schlossberger.

From the late 1940s he also worked with several developing countries in connection with medical development aid programmes of the West German government.

References

German public health doctors
German immunologists
German microbiologists
German tropical physicians
Academic staff of Sun Yat-sen University
Academic staff of Goethe University Frankfurt
German military personnel of World War I
German military doctors
Holocaust perpetrators in Poland
Nazi human subject research
Physicians in the Nazi Party
1876 births
1961 deaths
People from Bagrationovsk
People from East Prussia
German people in German East Africa